Johne Murphy (born 10 November 1984) is a retired Irish rugby union player who played wing, fullback or centre. On 27 August 2015, Murphy announced his retirement from rugby.

Family
Johne Murphy was born Rathangan, County Kildare to John and Mary Murphy and attended Newbridge College. The -e in Johne was to distinguish him from his father.

Leicester
Murphy played for Leicester Tigers from 2006 to 2010. The highlight of his time there was starting the 2009 Premiership final as Leicester defeated London Irish, despite being replaced by Matt Smith after 20 minutes.

Munster
Murphy left Leicester to join Munster for the 2010-11 season. He made his full debut for Munster in the opening league fixture against Aironi on 4 September 2010.

He won the 2010–11 Magners League in his first season at the province. Murphy signed a two-year contract extension with Munster in March 2012.

Murphy signed a one-year contract extension with Munster in April 2014, which will see him remain with the province until at least June 2015. In June 2015, it was announced that Murphy would be leaving Munster.

Ireland
Murphy played for the Ireland A side that was defeated by England Saxons on 1 February 2008.
He joined the Ireland squad for their 2010 Summer Tour as a replacement for Shane Horgan and played against the Barbarians in June 2010. He was called up to Ireland's senior training squad for the 2011 Six Nations Championship. Murphy was selected in the Emerging Ireland squad on 26 May 2014. He started against Russia in their first 2014 IRB Nations Cup match on 13 June 2014. He captained the team in their second game against Uruguay on 18 June 2014. Murphy started in the 31-10 win Romania on 22 June 2014, a win that secured the 2014 IRB Nations Cup for Emerging Ireland.

Honours

Leicester Tigers
English Premiership
Winner (3): 2006-07, 2008-09, 2009-10
Runner-Up (1): 2007-08
Anglo-Welsh Cup
Winner (1): 2006-07
Runner-Up (1): 2007-08
European Rugby Champions Cup 
Runner-Up (2): 2006-07, 2008-09

Munster
Celtic League
Winner (1): 2010–11

Ireland A
Churchill Cup:
Winner (1): 2009

Emerging Ireland
IRB Nations Cup
Winner (1): (2014)

References

External links
Leicester Profile
Munster Profile
ESPN Profile
Ireland Wolfhounds Profile

1984 births
Living people
People educated at Newbridge College
Rugby union players from County Kildare
Irish rugby union players
Leicester Tigers players
Munster Rugby players
Lansdowne Football Club players
Rugby union wings
Rugby union fullbacks
Rugby union centres